Gaspart is a surname and given name. Notable people with the name include:

 Gaspart Ventura (born 1955), Spanish water polo player
 Joan Gaspart (born 1944), Spanish businessman